Narapa is a monotypic genus of annelids belonging to the monotypic family Narapidae. The only species is Narapa bonettoi.

The species is found in Southern America.

References

Clitellata